Anthony Goldwire (born September 6, 1971) is an American former professional basketball player and coach. He played in the NBA, and other leagues. Born in West Palm Beach, Florida, he played college basketball for the University of Houston, and was drafted by the Phoenix Suns in the 2nd round (52nd overall), of the 1994 NBA draft.

Professional career
Goldwire began his career with the Yakima Sun Kings of the Continental Basketball Association (CBA) during the 1994–95 season and earned All-Rookie Second Team honors. He was named to the All-CBA First Team with the Sun Kings in the 1995–96 season.

Goldwire returned to the Sun Kings in the 2002–03 season. He was named to the All-CBA First Team in 2004. Goldwire led the Sun Kings to a CBA championship in 2006 as he was named Finals Most Valuable Player, league Most Valuable Player and a member of the All-CBA First Team.

Goldwire played with Panellinios of the Greek Basket League in the 2006–07 season. In 2009, he joined the Spanish club CB Girona.

NBA career statistics

Regular season

|-
| align="left" | 1995–96
| align="left" | Charlotte
| 42 || 8 || 14.8 || .402 || .398 || .767 || 1.0 || 2.7 || 0.4 || 0.0 || 5.5
|-
| align="left" | 1996–97
| align="left" | Charlotte
| 33 || 9 || 17.5 || .403 || .439 || .750 || 1.2 || 2.8 || 0.6 || 0.0 || 5.8
|-
| align="left" | 1996–97
| align="left" | Denver
| 27 || 21 || 22.7 || .392 || .394 || .816 || 1.7 || 4.6 || 0.5 || 0.0 || 7.3
|-
| align="left" | 1997–98
| align="left" | Denver
| style="background:#cfecec;"| 82* || 32 || 27.0 || .423 || .384 || .806 || 1.8 || 3.4 || 1.0 || 0.1 || 9.2
|-
| align="left" | 2000–01
| align="left" | Denver
| 20 || 0 || 10.1 || .375 || .265 || .765 || 0.6 || 1.7 || 0.5 || 0.0 || 4.1
|-
| align="left" | 2002–03
| align="left" | San Antonio
| 10 || 0 || 5.1 || .278 || .250 || .000 || 0.3 || 0.3 || 0.3 || 0.0 || 1.2
|-
| align="left" | 2002–03
| align="left" | Washington
| 5 || 0 || 6.8 || .571 || 1.000 || .800 || 0.6 || 0.2 || 0.0 || 0.0 || 2.6
|-
| align="left" | 2003–04
| align="left" | Minnesota
| 5 || 0 || 13.2 || .357 || .333 || 1.000 || 1.2 || 2.0 || 0.6 || 0.0 || 2.6
|-
| align="left" | 2003–04
| align="left" | New Jersey
| 6 || 0 || 3.2 || .250 || .000 || .000 || 0.2 || 0.2 || 0.3 || 0.0 || 0.7
|-
| align="left" | 2004–05
| align="left" | Detroit
| 9 || 0 || 6.1 || .267 || .333 || .875 || 0.9 || 0.0 || 0.0 || 0.0 || 2.0
|-
| align="left" | 2004–05
| align="left" | Milwaukee
| 24 || 2 || 20.1 || .438 || .408 || .826 || 2.1 || 3.3 || 0.6 || 0.0 || 6.4
|-
| align="left" | 2005–06
| align="left" | Los Angeles
| 3 || 0 || 7.3 || .143 || .000 || .000 || 0.3 || 0.7 || 0.0 || 0.0 || 0.7
|- class="sortbottom"
| style="text-align:center;" colspan="2"| Career
| 266 || 72 || 18.6 || .407 || .386 || .792 || 1.3 || 2.8 || 0.6 || 0.0 || 6.3
|}

Coaching career
In July 2010, Goldwire joined the Phoenix Suns' NBA Summer League coaching staff. He later became an assistant coach for the NBA's Milwaukee Bucks.

Personal life
Goldwire's cousin Leemire, was also a professional basketball player.

References

External links
NBA Player Profile
Player Statistics

1971 births
Living people
African-American basketball players
Aigaleo B.C. players
American expatriate basketball people in Greece
American expatriate basketball people in Russia
American expatriate basketball people in Spain
American men's basketball players
Aris B.C. players
Basketball coaches from Florida
Basketball players from Florida
Charlotte Hornets players
Cleveland Cavaliers players
CBA All-Star Game players
Denver Nuggets players
Detroit Pistons players
Erie BayHawks (2008–2017) coaches
FC Barcelona Bàsquet players
Houston Cougars men's basketball players
Houston Cougars men's basketball coaches
Kansas City Knights players
Liga ACB players
Milwaukee Bucks assistant coaches
Milwaukee Bucks players
Minnesota Timberwolves players
New Jersey Nets players
Olympiacos B.C. players
Panellinios B.C. players
PBC Lokomotiv-Kuban players
Pensacola State Pirates men's basketball players
Phoenix Suns draft picks
Phoenix Suns players
Point guards
San Antonio Spurs players
Valencia Basket players
Washington Wizards players
Yakama Sun Kings players
Yakima Sun Kings players
21st-century African-American sportspeople
20th-century African-American sportspeople
Criollos de Caguas basketball players